Djibouti–Turkey relations are the bilateral relations between Djibouti and Turkey. Currently, Turkey has an embassy in Djibouti since 2013, while Djibouti has an embassy in Ankara since 2012.

Diplomatic relations 
Both countries officially established diplomatic relations in 1977. 
The Abdülhamid II Mosque, the biggest mosque in Djibouti, was funded by the Turkish Diyanet Foundation. The building includes a school section as well.

High-level visits 
President of Djibouti Ismaïl Omar Guelleh visited Turkey 4 times, all of them between 2009 and 2018 and President of Turkey Recep Tayyip Erdoğan visited Djibouti once in January 2015.

Economic relations 
Trade volume between the two countries was $196,000,000 in 2018 and $251,000,000 in 2019. The fourth Turkey-Djibouti Joint Economic Commission (JEC) meeting was in Ankara on 18-19 February 2020.

Educational relations 
Turkey is providing scholarships to Djiboutian students since 1992, as part of the Türkiye Scholarships.

See also 
 Foreign relations of Turkey
 Foreign relations of Djibouti

References 

 
Turkey
Djibouti